The five-stroke engine is currently a concept engine invented by Gerhard Schmitz in 2000. Schmitz's concept is being developed by Ilmor Engineering. Ilmor's prototype is an internal combustion engine that uses a solid cylinder block with electric motors driving the oil and water cooling pumps. The prototype uses two overhead camshafts with standard poppet valves. The five-stroke prototype engine is turbocharged. The goal of the five-stroke engine is to have higher efficiency with lower fuel use. In order to increase efficiency, a secondary cylinder is added as an expansion processor to extract more energy from the fuel.

Gerhard Schmitz's concept engine uses two high pressure (HP) fired cylinders with standard four-stroke engine power cycles. The exhaust gas from the two HP work cylinders is fed into a one larger central low pressure (LP) expansion cylinder. The hot exhaust is used to produce more power. The low pressure expansion cylinder is adjustable to maintain the best expansion ratio, regardless of the compression ratio. The prototype has produced very good fuel consumption over a standard gas engine, by about 10%.

This concept is similar to that of compound steam engines, which expand steam in high pressure cylinders before exhausting it into low-pressure cylinders in order to extract more energy from the steam. Nicolaus Otto built in 1879 a 5-stroke engine with same arrangement as Ilmor, but customers returned it due to poor performance. 'The romance of engines', T Suzuki, SAE, pp 87–93. Two Spanish patents, ES0156621, F Jimeno-Cataneo, 1942; and ES0433850, C Ubierna-Laciana, 1975; describe 5-Stroke engines identical to that of Gerhard Schmitz, this engine had a fellowship to Burgundy University to be studied. JW Eisenhuth patented, US640890, 1900, an 'Air and gas engine', with double expansion. A car with this engine was in exhibition in Harrah collection, fate of car after the collection was dismantled is unknown.

Applications
A planned motorcycle design from Ilmor Engineering 1,478 cc totally 3 cylinder (HP and LP cylinders) uses a five-stroke engine.

Advantages
 For a gasoline engine, the engine has an expansion ratio near that of diesel engine, about 14.5:1.
 Adjustable compression.
 Higher mean effective pressure with less fuel, due to expansion cylinder.
 Use standard engine parts, no special one of a kind parts.
 In theory, additional water injection can be used for cooling the cylinder walls. It leads to quick steam expansion and can increase the efficiency of the expansion cylinder.

Disadvantages
 Increased costs due unique design. Not yet mass-produced.
 Two different cylinder sizes.
 More complex than 2 cylinder engine.

Specification
 Current prototype is for motorcycle use.
 3 cylinder (two high pressure and one low pressure)
 700 cc 2 HP cylinder
 1478 cc total 3 cylinders (HP and LP)
 130 horsepower @ 7000rpm
 166 Nm @ 5000rpm 
 226g/kWh BSFC

See also

 Desmodromic valve
 History of the internal combustion engine
 Napier Deltic
 Poppet valve
 Radial engine
 Rotary engine
 Stirling engine
 Stroke (engine)
 Two- and four-stroke engines
 Two-stroke engine
 Four-stroke engine
 Four-stroke internal combustion engine'' 
 Six-stroke engine
 Sleeve valve
 Thermodynamic cycle
 Atkinson cycle
 Miller cycle

References

External links
Four stroke engine animation
Detailed Engine Animations 
How Car Engines Work
Animated Engines, four stroke , another explanation of the four-stroke engine.
New 4 stroke

Internal combustion piston engines